Lada Negrul, (born April 18, 1967) is a Russian actress.  She works in Moscow's "Russian House" theater  and played main roles in ten Russian movies, including a TV serial "Dirty Work". She is the author and producer of documentaries about Irina Skobtseva, Sergei Bondarchuk, and Vladislav Galkin. 

Negrul published four books of her poetry  and a book about Alexander Men. She also performs sound poetry and songs by Alexander Galich and Vladimir Vysotsky.

References

External links
Her official website 
Her YouTube uploads
Her page in Livejournal 
Interview with Lada Negrul on Russian TV

1972 births
Living people
Russian actresses